William Short was an English professional footballer who played as an inside forward.

References

English footballers
Association football forwards
Burnley F.C. players
English Football League players
Year of birth missing
Year of death missing